Jang Se-hong (장세홍, born 23 October 1953) is a retired light-flyweight freestyle wrestler from North Korea. He won silver medals at the 1978 Asian Games and 1980 Olympics.

References

External links
 

1953 births
Living people
Olympic wrestlers of North Korea
Wrestlers at the 1980 Summer Olympics
North Korean male sport wrestlers
Olympic silver medalists for North Korea
Olympic medalists in wrestling
Asian Games medalists in wrestling
Wrestlers at the 1978 Asian Games
Medalists at the 1980 Summer Olympics
Asian Games silver medalists for North Korea
Medalists at the 1978 Asian Games